Apalharpactes is a genus of birds in the family Trogonidae. They are restricted to humid highland forest on the Indonesian islands of Java and Sumatra. Unlike all other Asian trogons, their plumage is mainly green above and yellow below. Compared to most trogons, the sexual dimorphism is relatively small. The two species in the genus resemble each other, but A. reinwardtii is larger than A. mackloti, and the male A. mackloti has a chestnut rump-patch, which A. reinwardtii lacks. They feed on arthropods, small lizards and fruit.

Taxonomy
The members of Apalharpactes are sometimes placed in the genus Harpactes instead. However a 2010 study found that the two genera are actually distantly related and thus valid.

The two species of Apalharpactes were formerly treated as conspecific under the name red-billed trogon or blue-tailed trogon (Apalharpactes reinwardtii, with mackloti as a subspecies), but are better treated as separate species.

References
 Allen, R. (2001). Genus Apalharpactes. Pp. 106 in: del Hoyo, J., A. Elliott, & J. Sargatal. eds. (2001). Handbook of the Birds of the World. Vol. 6. Mousebirds to Hornbills. Lynx Edicions, Barcelona. 

 
Bird genera
Taxa named by Charles Lucien Bonaparte
Taxonomy articles created by Polbot